Fashion Island is a shopping mall located on Ramintra Road, in Khan Na Yao District outskirt of Bangkok, Thailand.

Fashion Island is currently ranked as the Twenty-sixth largest mall in the World along with Dubai Mall and West Edmonton Mall (once biggest mall in the world until 2004).

The shopping mall featured an amusement park with a monorail circling around the mall. The amusement park and monorail were both shut down after an accident. On 26 June 2002, a short circuit caused one train to catch fire. The train had no circuit breaker, and the passenger compartment was not protected by fireproof insulation. Two girls, six and eight years old, died in the fire, and two more children were injured from jumping out of the train.

Fashion Island is also located near the Outer Ring Road - Ram Inthra Station of the Pink Line Monorail that connected Nonthaburi and Bangkok.

Anchors 
 Robinson Department Store
 Tops (Old Tops Market)
 B2S
 Supersports
 Power Buy
 Officemate
 Central Power Center
 Big C
 Gourmet Market
 Major Cineplex
 Fashion Island 7 Cinemas (Old EGV Fashion Island)
 Promenade Cineplex 8 Cinemas
 HomePro (Old Fashion Island Zone Move To New Parking Building B)
 The Power by Homepro
 Bike Express
 Food Island
 Sports World
 HarborLand
 Kidzoona
 Prom Garden
 Prom Market
 Fitness First
 Island Hall

See also
List of shopping malls in Thailand
List of largest shopping malls in Thailand

References

External links
Welcome to Fashion Island: About Us
 360° tour

Shopping malls in Bangkok
Khan Na Yao district
Shopping malls established in 1995
1995 establishments in Thailand
Thai companies established in 1995
Retail companies established in 1995